Edward William Derek Jeffares (24 May 1917 in Grahamstown, Cape Province, South Africa – 14 October 1994 in Stratford-on-Slaney, County Wicklow, Ireland) was a South African-born Irish cricketer. A right-handed batsman, he played one first-class cricket match for Madras against Bombay in the quarter final of the Ranji Trophy in February 1949. His brother Shaun played cricket in Ireland.

References

1917 births
1994 deaths
Irish cricketers
Tamil Nadu cricketers
People from Makhanda, Eastern Cape
South African emigrants to Ireland
Irish expatriates in India
Cricketers from the Eastern Cape